Amparo Valle Vicente (15 July 1937 – 29 September 2016) was a Spanish actress. She appeared in more than eighty films from 1964 to 2016.

Biography 
She was born on 15 July 1937 in Valencia, Spain.

She began her career on stage in a 1959 production of The Crime on Goats Island. Between 1998 and 2002, she appeared in the TV series Periodistas, directed by Alejandro Amenábar, in the role of 'Marta Cuesta', which is closely modelled on Ramón Sampedro statements. In 1999, she appeared in Flores de otro mundo, in the role of 'Gregoria', the mother of the farmer Damián (Luis Tosar).

She was married to theatrical director Gerardo Malla and they have two children: Coque Malla and Miguel Malla. Her last work was La carta, a song composed alongside her son Coque Malla. She died on 29 September 2016, aged 79, of lung cancer in Valencia, Spain.

Filmography 
She appeared frequently in films from the 1960s including:

She also appeared on television in productions of:

References

Bibliography

External links 

1939 births
2016 deaths
Spanish film actresses
20th-century Spanish actresses
21st-century Spanish actresses
Deaths from lung cancer